Gutawa is a surname. Notable people with the surname include:

Erwin Gutawa (born 1962), Indonesian composer and songwriter
Erwin Gutawa (footballer) (born 1992), Indonesian footballer
Gita Gutawa (born 1993), Indonesian singer, actress, and songwriter, daughter of Erwin